Rineloricaria cubataonis is a species of catfish in the family Loricariidae. It is a freshwater fish native to South America, where it occurs in Atlantic coastal rivers in southeastern Brazil, with its type locality reportedly being the Cubatão River in the state of Santa Catarina. The species reaches 5.4 cm (2.1 inches) in standard length and is believed to be a facultative air-breather.

References 

Fish described in 1907
Loricariidae
Catfish of South America
Fish of Brazil